Langeland is a Danish island.

Langeland may also refer to:

People
 Abel, Lord of Langeland (1252–1279), son of King Abel of Denmark
 Arne Langeland (born 1928), Norwegian jurist, civil servant and diplomat
 Eric Longlegs, Lord of Langeland (1272–1310), son of Eric I, Duke of Schleswig
 Hallgeir H. Langeland (born 1955), Norwegian politician for the Socialist Left Party
 Henrik Langeland, (born 1972), Norwegian novelist
 Kjeld Langeland (1920–1973), Norwegian politician for the Conservative Party
 Knud Langeland (1813-1886), American newspaper editor and politician
 Olav Rasmussen Langeland (1904–1981), Norwegian politician for the Centre Party
 Oliver H. Langeland (1887–1958), Norwegian military officer and civil servant
 Rasmus Olsen Langeland (1873–1954), Norwegian Minister of Labour 1931-1933
 Sinikka Langeland (born 1961), Norwegian traditional folk singer

Places 
 Langeland Municipality, consisting mainly of the island of Langeland
 Langeland (Bad Driburg), a district of Bad Driburg, Germany

Ships 
 HDMS Langeland (1808), a ship transferred to Norwegian ports from Denmark
 MV Langeland, a Norwegian cargo ship

See also
 Langelands Festival, a family festival in Denmark